Nationality words link to articles with information on the nation's poetry or literature (for instance, Irish or France).

Works published

Great Britain
 Sir John Denham, Cato Major of Old Age, a verse paraphrase of Cicero's De senectute
 Richard Flecknoe, Epigrams of All Sorts

Other
 René Rapin, Observations sur les poèmes d'Homère et de Virgile, critical essay, Paris; France

Births
Death years link to the corresponding "[year] in poetry" article:
 February 3 – Kada no Azumamaro (died 1736), Japanese early Edo period poet and philologist

Deaths
Birth years link to the corresponding "[year] in poetry" article:
 March 19 – John Denham (born 1614 or 1615), English poet and courtier, buried in Westminster Abbey
 September 3 – Esteban Manuel de Villegas (born 1589), Spanish
 September 30 – Henry King (born 1592), English poet and bishop
 October 8 – Jane Cavendish (born 1621), English poet and playwright

See also

 Poetry
 17th century in poetry
 17th century in literature
 Restoration literature

Notes

17th-century poetry
Poetry